James Frederick Liddle (born 29 November 1910) was an English professional footballer. He played for Queens Park Rangers, Huddersfield Town, Rotherham United, Newcastle United, Gillingham, Coventry City and Exeter City between 1927 and 1939.

References

1910 births
Year of death missing
English footballers
English Football League players
Association football forwards
Gillingham F.C. players
Queens Park Rangers F.C. players
Huddersfield Town A.F.C. players
Halifax Town A.F.C. players
Exeter City F.C. players
Newcastle United F.C. players
Coventry City F.C. players
Rotherham United F.C. players